Ethridge House may refer to:

Ethridge House (Hope, Arkansas), listed on the National Register of Historic Places in Hempstead County, Arkansas
Ethridge House (Colfax, Louisiana), listed on the National Register of Historic Places in Grant County, Louisiana